Aubrey Frederick James Beauclerk (3 May 1817 – 3 January 1853) was an English cricketer active in 1837, playing in two first-class cricket matches.

The son of Lord Frederick Beauclerk and Charlotte Dillon-Lee, Beauclerk attended Charterhouse School from 1826, and he later made two appearances in first-class cricket in 1837. His first appearance came for the Marylebone Cricket Club against Oxford University, while his second appearance came for The Bs against the Marylebone Cricket Club. He scored a total of 13 runs in his two matches, with a top score of 7. Outside of cricket he was also a captain in the British Army, serving in the Guards and 7th Foot. He died, unmarried, at Swindon, Wiltshire on 3 January 1853.

His father, brother Charles, and cousin Lord Burford were all first-class cricketers.

References

External links
Aubrey Beauclerk at ESPNcricinfo
Aubrey Beauclerk at CricketArchive

`

1817 births
1853 deaths
Sportspeople from Hitchin
People educated at Charterhouse School
English cricketers
Marylebone Cricket Club cricketers
The Bs cricketers
Royal Fusiliers officers
Aubrey